Trigonostigma truncata, is a species of ray-finned fish in the genus Trigonostigma.

References 

truncata
Fish described in 2020
Cyprinidae
Taxa named by Heok Hui Tan